Danila Svyatoslavovich Yemelyanov (born 23 January 2000) is a Russian football player who plays as an attacking midfielder for FC Ufa.

Club career
He made his debut in the Russian Professional Football League for FC Ufa-2 on 24 July 2018 in a game against FC Neftekhimik Nizhnekamsk.

He made his debut in the Russian Premier League for FC Ufa on 13 July 2019 in a game against FC Ural Yekaterinburg, as a 67th-minute substitute for Dmitri Sysuyev.

On 7 October 2020, he joined FC Volgar Astrakhan on loan.

On 9 June 2021, he moved on loan to FC Neftekhimik Nizhnekamsk. He returned to Ufa on 29 December 2021.

Career statistics

References

External links
 
 Profile by Russian Professional Football League

2000 births
People from Ashinsky District
Sportspeople from Chelyabinsk Oblast
Living people
Russian footballers
Russia youth international footballers
Association football midfielders
FC Ufa players
FC Volgar Astrakhan players
FC Neftekhimik Nizhnekamsk players
Russian Premier League players
Russian First League players
Russian Second League players